Frank J. Meek  (March 14, 1867 – December 22, 1922) was a Major League Baseball catcher who played in six games for the St. Louis Browns of the American Association in 1889-90. Per his SABR biography the nickname "Dad" Meek is incorrect. Frank Meek was not called that during his lifetime—the confusion arose because another baseball player, Harry Meek, had that nickname and the two were conflated at some point in 1915-1916.

References 

Baseball Reference

 Frank Meek at SABR (Baseball BioProject)

1867 births
1922 deaths
Baseball players from Missouri
St. Louis Browns (AA) players
Quincy Ravens players
Emporia Reds players
19th-century baseball players